Stavropol Shpakovskoye Airport  (sometimes appearing as Mikhaylovskoye) is an airport in Stavropol Krai, Russia located 13 km northeast of Stavropol.

It services medium-sized airliners with 14 parking spaces.  It is also a small military training base, previously home to the Stavropol Higher Military Aviation School of Pilots and Navigators PVO im. Marshal of Aviation V.A. Sudts (SVVAULSh), and 163rd OUAE (Separate Training Aviation Squadron) flying the Mi-8. The school was formed on 1 November 1969 and controlled four training aviation regiments (at Salsk, Khankala, Tikhoretsk, and Kholodnogorsk). In 1993, the school was renamed the Stavropol Higher Aviation Engineering Institute, with schools at Stavropol, Daugavpils and Lomonosov.

Airlines and destinations

References

External links
Shpakovskoye Airport Official Website 
Official Telegram channel
Official VK page

Russian Air Force bases
Soviet Air Force bases
Airports built in the Soviet Union
Airports in Stavropol Krai
Stavropol